Easy to Love is Kalil Wilson's self-produced debut album, released in 2009. It has been critically praised, and received support from jazz radio stations like KKJZ 88.1 Los Angeles and KCSM 91.1 San Francisco. 
 

Writes Raul Da Gama Rosa, AllAboutJazz.com contributing editor:

Track listing

References

2009 albums